Adzil Harcourt Holder (22 October 1931 – 21 March 2019) was a Barbadian cricketer who played first-class cricket for Barbados from 1951 to 1959.

Holder's outstanding match was against Trinidad in 1956-57, when he took 7 for 38 with his left-arm spin in the first innings and then made 52 batting at number 10, he and Frank King added 78 for the last wicket in 64 minutes; Barbados won by an innings. Later that season he played in the 12-a-side trial matches for the forthcoming tour of England. He took 6 for 60 in the second innings of the second trial match, but was not selected for the tour. 

He later went to Scotland, where he played as a professional for the Ferguslie, Clydesdale, and Clackmannan County clubs. 

Holder and his wife Winifred had two daughters.

References

External links
 
 

1931 births
2019 deaths
People from Saint Joseph, Barbados
People educated at Combermere School
Barbados cricketers
Barbadian cricketers